Downtown San Bernardino is a district in the city of San Bernardino, California, in San Bernardino County, United States. It is home to city and county government buildings, and to the city's central business district. The downtown area of San Bernardino is home to multiple (and the only) diplomatic missions for the Inland Empire, being one of only four California cities with multiple consulates (the other cities being Los Angeles, San Diego, and San Francisco). The governments of Guatemala (opened July 2014) and Mexico have established their consulates in the civic center. Downtown San Bernardino is bounded by I-215 to the west, Waterman Avenue to the east, Baseline Street to the north, and Mill Street to the south.

The San Bernardino City Council has initiated several redevelopment efforts. The city's Economic Development Agency presented the council with a draft of the Downtown Core Vision / Action Plan in 2009, created in partnership with the urban planning firm EDAW, as a guide for revitalizing downtown San Bernardino over the next 10 years. The city has also discussed the construction of a new government center/civic plaza that will contain an iconic 24-story tower. On May 11, 2014 the county of San Bernardino opened a 12-story, 200-foot-tall courthouse known as the San Bernardino Justice Center. The county is consolidating many county-wide court functions into the new structure, which is the tallest building in San Bernardino.

Parks

Seccombe Lake

Seccombe Lake Park includes a lake named after a former Mayor of San Bernardino. It is located at the corner of 5th Street and Sierra Way. On December 10, 2015, federal authorities searched the lake after receiving a tip that the shooters in the San Bernardino terrorist attack visited on the day of the attack. A dive team searched for evidence, but nothing relevant was found.

Entertainment district

Downtown is home to three performing arts venues and a movie theater, the most for any central business district in the Inland Empire. The city is planning a new district along Fourth Street. The key aspect of the plan is to make the area around the California Theater and future Regal San Bernardino Theater Square Stadium 14 site on Fourth Street as an area for entertainment and dining. The Regal Stadium 14 opened in the spring of 2012, but the need for new dining opportunities remains.

Opening of Regal Entertainment Group

Downtown San Bernardino had a large, luxurious, two-story theater until it closed in September 2008. Maya Cinemas was expected to open at the old site of the CinemaStar on February 27, 2009, however it failed to do so, and plans for a downtown San Bernardino theater were scratched. As of January 2011, Regal Entertainment Group was in negotiations with the city of San Bernardino to open a theater in the former Cinema Star site. In November 2011, the city of San Bernardino approved a negotiation with Regal has now taken over/rehabilitated the theater, which opened on June 29, 2012 with RPX under the name of Regal San Bernardino Theater Square Stadium 14 & RPX.

Norman F. Feldheym Central Library

The Norman F. Feldheym Central Library is the flagship of the San Bernardino Public Library system. It opened on September 30, 1985, and is the city's fifth central library building since the first one was operated out of a rented house in 1891. Architects Gregory Villanueva and Oscar Arnoni designed the  $6 million facility, which was named in honor of the late Rabbi Norman F. Feldheym. The library provides a number of cultural enrichment programs for youth and adults in the local community. Partnering with the San Bernardino City Unified School District, the library supports a community Reading Festival for third-graders and their families. The library also sponsors an annual book fair at Cal State San Bernardino, reading clubs, and an "Academy of Public Scholars" critical review club devoted to works of Continental philosophy.

City Hall

City Hall is a six-story building designed in 1963 by César Pelli to reflect the urban environment around it. Completed in 1972, the City Hall is modernist in style, has curtain walls, and is clad entirely in glass, with slim aluminum mullions. Parts of the building are raised off the ground by pilotis.

Downtown universities
American Sports University was a private, non-profit  sports business university in the downtown area which has remained unaccredited since its inception in 2006; it is seeking accreditation. It was granted approval to operate from the Bureau for Private Postsecondary and Vocational Education of the State of California. It closed in 2016.

California State University, San Bernardino has plans to open a downtown campus/center near the 2nd/E Street intersection.

Transportation

Transit Center
The Downtown Transit Center is located on a five-acre site located on the southwest corner of Rialto Avenue and E Street near the San Manuel Stadium. The Transit Center connects the Mountain Areas and the High Desert with the rest of Southern California, via Omnitrans, the Mountain Area Regional Transit Authority and the Victor Valley Transit Authority. It serves as a transfer point for bus routes the county, with connections to the sbX Bus Rapid Transit system, which connects Verdemont/California State University, San Bernardino to the Veterans Hospital in Loma Linda and the Downtown San Bernardino Passenger Rail System; which is a one-mile Metrolink extension from the Santa Fe Depot, and the Arrow passenger rail with stops en route to the University of Redlands.

San Bernardino International Airport
The San Bernardino International Airport provides both domestic and international air services. Bus services serve the airport, which lies two miles (5 km) from downtown.

Buildings

Main buildings

Other buildings

 San Bernardino Employment and Training Agency Building
 The Enterprise Building (formerly known as The Andreson Building)
 American Trust Building
 Bank Of America Building
 Wells Fargo Building
 Chase Building
 First American Title Building
 Building 505
 San Bernardino County Center Building
 County of San Bernardino Court 2 Building in 3rd Street
 County Records Tower
 Vanir Tower
 Norman F. Feldheym Central Library
 Medrobrook Tower

Gallery

References

External links
 

San Bernardino
 
Neighborhoods in San Bernardino, California

ar:سان بيرناردينو، كاليفورنيا
bg:Сан Бернардино (град)
de:San Bernardino (Kalifornien)
fr:San Bernardino
ko:샌버너디노
it:San Bernardino (California)
nl:San Bernardino (Californië)
ja:サンバーナーディーノ (カリフォルニア州)
pl:San Bernardino
pt:San Bernardino (Califórnia)
ro:San Bernardino, California
fi:San Bernardino (Kalifornia)
sv:San Bernardino
vo:San Bernardino